William Ross Wallace (1819 – May 5, 1881) was an American poet, with Scottish roots, best known for writing "The Hand That Rocks The Cradle Is The Hand That Rules The World".

Early life
Wallace was born in Lexington, Kentucky in 1819. His father, a Presbyterian preacher, died when Wallace was an infant. 

Wallace was educated at Indiana University and Hanover College, Indiana, and studied law in Lexington, Kentucky.

Career 
In 1841, he moved to New York City, where he practiced law, and at the same time engaged in literary pursuits. "Perdita", a poem, was his first work. Published in the Union Magazine, it  attracted favorable criticism and was followed by "Alban" (1848), a poetical romance, and "Meditations in America" (1851). Other poems that attained popularity include "The Sword of Bunker Hill" (1861), a national hymn; "Keep Step with the Music of the Union" (1861); "The Liberty Bell" (1862); and his most famous poem, "The Hand That Rocks The Cradle Is The Hand That Rules The World" (1865), a poem praising motherhood. He contributed to Godey's Lady's Book, Harper's Magazine, Harper's Weekly, the New York Ledger, and the Louisville Daily Journal. William Cullen Bryant said of his writings: "They are marked by a splendor of imagination and an affluence of diction which show him the born poet." Edgar Allan Poe, a friend of Wallace, referred to him as "one of the very noblest of American poets". Wallace died at his home in New York City on May 5, 1881, a week after suffering a stroke. He was working on a book to be titled Pleasures of the Beautiful at the time of his death.

Personal life
Wallace married his second wife Ann Polhemus Riker, the daughter of Daniel Riker (1771–1828) and Helen Polhemus (1783–?), in October 1856. They had two daughters and a son.

Books by Wallace
The Battle of Tippecanoe, Triumphs of Science, and Other Poems (1837)
Wordsworth: A Poem (1846)
Alban the Pirate: A Romaunt of the Metropolis (1848)
Meditations in America, and Other Poems (1851)
Prattsville, an American Poem (1852)
The Loved and the Lost (1856)
Progress of the United States: Henry Clay, an Ode "Of Thine Own Country Sing" (1856)
Patriotic and Heroic Eloquence: A Book for the Patriot, Statesman and Student (1861)
The Liberty Bell (1862)

Notes

References

External links

 
 
 

1819 births
1881 deaths
Poets from Kentucky
Hanover College alumni
Indiana University alumni
19th-century American poets
American male poets
19th-century American male writers